A. Rami Reddi was an Indian politician. He was elected to the Madras Legislative Assembly in the 1952 election, standing as the Indian National Congress candidate in the Duggirala constituency. A. Rami Reddi obtained 19,002 votes (41.63% of the votes in the constituency).

References

Indian National Congress politicians
Members of the Tamil Nadu Legislative Assembly
Year of birth missing
Place of birth missing
Indian National Congress politicians from Tamil Nadu